KLGT (96.5 FM Hot Country Kix 96.5) is a radio station broadcasting a country music format. Licensed to Buffalo, Wyoming, United States, the station serves the Sheridan area, and most of northeastern Wyoming. The station is currently owned by Big Horn Mountain Radio Network, a division of Legend Communications of Wyoming, LLC.

KLGT shares studios with KBBS and KZZS at 1221 Fort Street west of Buffalo. KLGT and KZZS share a transmitter site off East Eby Road in Story, WY. Sister station KHRW has studios at 324 Coffeen Avenue in Sheridan.

History
The station was assigned the call letters KLGM on December 6, 1982. On April 1, 1986, the station changed its call sign to the current KLGT.

References

External links

LGT
Country radio stations in the United States
Johnson County, Wyoming
Radio stations established in 1982
1982 establishments in Wyoming